Tiza may refer to:

People
 Tiza Mafira, Indonesian environmental activist

Places
 La Tiza, Panama
 Tiza, Boumerdès, Algeria

Other
 Tarek ibn Ziyad Academy, United States